Anthony Neville Howell (born 18 February 1947) is a retired Rear Admiral of the South African Navy. After completing school at Fish Hoek High School he joined the Navy in 1965. He completed a B. Mil degree at the South African Military Academy in 1968 and then volunteered for submarines. He commanded the submarine SAS Maria van Riebeeck from 1981 to 1983. He was the Officer Commanding South African Naval College from 1989 to 1992. In 1993 he was promoted to Commodore (later changed to Rear Admiral (Junior Grade)) and appointed Chief of Naval Staff Plans. In 1998 he was appointed Director Naval Acquisition before being promoted to rear admiral on 1 April 1999 with appointment as Chief Director Maritime Warfare. He retired from the Navy on 31 July 2001

References

South African admirals
Living people
1947 births
Place of birth missing (living people)
Submarine commanders